The 2015 Black-Eyed Susan Stakes was the 91st running of the Black-Eyed Susan Stakes. The race took place on May 15, 2015, and was televised in the United States on the NBC Sports Network. Ridden by jockey Javier Castellano, Keen Pauline won the race by a two and three-quarter lengths over runner-up Include Betty. Approximate post time on the Friday evening before the Preakness Stakes was 4:52 p.m. Eastern Time. The Maryland Jockey Club supplied a purse of $250,000 for the 91st running. The race was run over a fast track in a final time of 1:50.46.  The Maryland Jockey Club reported a Black-Eyed Susan Stakes Day record attendance of 42,700. The attendance at Pimlico Race Course that day was a record crowd for Black-Eyed Susan Stakes Day.

Payout 

The 91st Black-Eyed Susan Stakes Payout Schedule

$2 Exacta:  (9–5) paid   $ 211.00

$2 Trifecta:  (9–5–3) paid   $ 1,356.00

$1 Superfecta:  (9–5–3-1) paid   $ 1,629.90

The full chart 

 Winning Breeder: Stonestreet Stables; (KY)  
 Final Time: 1:50.46
 Track Condition: Fast
 Total Attendance: Record of 42,700

See also 
 2015 Preakness Stakes
 Black-Eyed Susan Stakes Stakes "top three finishers" and # of  starters

References

External links 
 Official Black-Eyed Susan Stakes website
 Official Preakness website

2015 in horse racing
Horse races in Maryland
2015 in American sports
2015 in sports in Maryland
Black-Eyed Susan Stakes